The Brainwashers is a Canadian animated short film, directed by Patrick Bouchard and released in 2002. The film centres on two chimney sweeps cleaning memories out of a man's brain in an attempt to understand how the human thought process works.

The film won the Prix Jutra for Best Animated Short Film at the 5th Jutra Awards.

References

External links
 

2002 films
2000s animated short films
Canadian animated short films
National Film Board of Canada animated short films
Films directed by Patrick Bouchard
2000s Canadian films
Best Animated Short Film Jutra and Iris Award winners